James Morgan Sinclair (14 May 1907 – 9 September 2005) was an Australian rules footballer who played with Hawthorn in the Victorian Football League (VFL).

Joining Hawthorn from Montrose at the start of the 1927 VFL season, Sinclair played 6 games (all losses) in his first season at the club. He did not make a senior appearance in 1928 and at the start of the 1929 season transferred to Yarraville.

Notes

External links 

1907 births
2005 deaths
Australian rules footballers from Melbourne
Hawthorn Football Club players
People from Richmond, Victoria